Richard E. Ripple (1931–2010) was an American educational psychologist. He was a professor at Cornell University for 49 years and editor-in-chief of the Educational Psychologist from 1969 to 1972.

References 

20th-century American psychologists
1931 births
2010 deaths
Cornell University faculty
Educational psychologists
Educational Psychologist (journal) editors